Victor Charles George Brooks (born 29 June 1948) is a former English cricketer.  Brooks is a left-handed batsman who occasionally fielded as a wicket-keeper.  He was born at East Ham, Essex.

Brooks made his debut for Essex in a List A match against Sussex in the 1969 Player's County League, with him making a further appearance in that season's competition against Surrey.  The following season he made his first-class debut against the touring Jamaicans.  In 1971 Brooks made two further first-class appearances, against Warwickshire and Kent, as well as making a further List A appearance against Hampshire in the John Player League.  In first-class cricket, Brooks scored 53 runs at an average of 10.60, with a highest score of 22.  In List A cricket, he scored 6 runs at an average of 2.00, with a highest score of 6.

References

External links
Vic Brooks at ESPNcricinfo
Vic Brooks at CricketArchive

1948 births
Living people
People from East Ham
English cricketers
Essex cricketers